General Sir Richard George Lawson  KCSS (born 24 November 1927) is a former British Army officer, who served as General Officer Commanding in Northern Ireland during the Troubles, and later as Commander-in-Chief of Allied Forces Northern Europe.

Early career
He was commissioned into the Royal Tank Regiment as a second lieutenant on 15 July 1948, after leaving the Royal Military Academy Sandhurst, and promoted lieutenant on 15 July 1950.

Congo and Yemen
Lawson was promoted to major on 16 July 1961. In December 1961, he volunteered for service with the United Nations peacekeeping force in the Republic of the Congo. At the time he was attached to the Nigerian Army, on secondment from the 1st Royal Tank Regiment. He served in South Kasai and then Katanga, where he became briefly famous for his part in the rescue of several groups of missionaries, and was nicknamed "Dick the Lionheart" by the Daily Express.

In 1963 he published a book recounting his time in the Congo, entitled Strange Soldiering: Major Lawson's own dramatic story of his experiences with the third Nigerian brigade. For his actions he was appointed a Companion of the Distinguished Service Order (DSO) on 30 March 1962, and the Nigerian officer, Major Conrad Nwawo, 1st Battalion, The Queen's Own Nigeria Regiment, who accompanied Lawson was awarded the Military Cross, Lawson was also appointed an Officer of the Order of the Crown of Belgium, and a Knight Commander of the Papal Order of St. Sylvester.

From March to November 1967 Lawson undertook another secondment in a British colony on the verge of independence, the Federation of South Arabia (now part of Yemen), acting as GSO1 to the British forces stationed there, training local officers in staff duties, and overseeing the transition to local forces controlling security in Aden; for this he was appointed an Officer of the Order of the British Empire (OBE) on 8 June 1968, in the Queen's Birthday Honours. During this period he was promoted lieutenant-colonel on 30 June 1967. He was promoted colonel on 6 July 1971 and brigadier on 31 December 1971.

Promotion to general officer
From 1972 to 1973 he commanded 20th Armoured Brigade. On 7 November 1977 he took command of 1st Armoured Division with the acting rank of major-general, and received substantive promotion on 30 June 1978 (with seniority from 1 April 1976). On 3 November 1979, he ceased to command 1st Division.

He succeeded Timothy Creasey as GOC Northern Ireland on 1 December 1979, and was promoted to lieutenant-general after his appointment. He was himself succeeded by Robert Richardson on 1 June 1982. In the 1980 New Year Honours he was appointed a Knight Commander of the Order of the Bath (KCB), and on 1 January 1980 he was appointed Colonel Commandant of the Royal Tank Regiment, a post he held until 1 June 1982.

He was appointed Commander-in-Chief of Allied Forces Northern Europe, a NATO post, on 15 November 1982, replacing Anthony Farrar-Hockley, and was promoted to general on his appointment. He was succeeded by Geoffrey Howlett on 10 February 1986. He retired from the army on 28 May 1986.

References

External links
Portrait by Robin Paine, 1985.

|-

|-

|-

1927 births
Living people
British Army generals
Royal Tank Regiment officers
Officers of the Order of the British Empire
Knights Commander of the Order of the Bath
Companions of the Distinguished Service Order
British military personnel of the Aden Emergency
Recipients of the Order of the Crown (Belgium)
Graduates of the Royal Military Academy Sandhurst
British military personnel of The Troubles (Northern Ireland)
Knights of the Order of St. Sylvester